Coenochroa illibella, the dune panic grass moth, is a species of snout moth in the genus Coenochroa. It was described by George Duryea Hulst in 1887. It is found in North America, including Texas, Arizona, Colorado, California, Indiana and Ontario.

References

Moths described in 1889
Phycitinae